The Type 722 II class LCAC with NATO reporting name Jinsha II class LCAC is a medium size air-cushioned landing craft (hovercraft) operated by the People's Liberation Army Navy of China. It is frequently but erroneously referred by many as Dagu class, its predecessor, due to misspelling and lack of information in the 1970s, when these projects first appeared. There are also other names for this class, mostly resulting from different transliterations.

Type 716 LCAC
The origin of Type 722 II class LCAC can be traced straight back in the late 1960s to Type 716 LCAC, from which Type 722 II class eventually developed from directly. In the late 1960s, People's Liberation Army General Logistics Department asked 708th Research Institute to design a prototype LCAC for logistic needs to supply coastal islands, but due to political turmoil in China, namely, Cultural Revolution, construction took three years after the design was approved, and it was not until 1978 when the boat was finally completed by Hudong Shipbuilding (沪东造船厂) in Shanghai and entered service in the same year. NATO reporting name Dagu A class was given to Type 716 LCAC, which achieved speed over 100 km per hour during trials in Dianshan Lake, before being sent to South China Sea for further evaluation. Specifications:
Length: 17.94 meter
Width: 8.3 meter
Height: 4.55 meter
Displacement: 18.6 ton
Speed: > 100 km / hr
Complement: crw + 32 troops (a platoon) or 2 tons of cargo
Engine: 1 piston driven aero-engine
NATO reporting name Dagu A class was erroneously used to refer other Chinese LCACs, but analysis of the technical data revealed that this name is actually for Type 716 class (also Type 716 I class when the upgraded version appeared later), when more information became available from Chinese official sources years later.

Type 716 II LCAC
Type 716 LCAC did not enter mass production after the prototype was built due to its fatal design flaw: the propulsion system was an aeroengine driven by gasoline, which is prone to fire. 708th Research Institute and Hudong Shipyard completed its upgrade in 1983, which replaced the original gasoline engine with a 12L413FC diesel engine. Other improvements included utilization of ducted propeller, and redesigned skirt and propulsion system. The improvement version is designed by Chinese as Type 716 II class LCAC', with NATO reporting name as Dagu B class, and experienced gained from this class was directly used on later Type 722 II class LCAC.

Type 722 LCAC
In 1975, after the design of Type 716 LCAC was approved, Chinese navy asked 708th Research Institute to design a medium-sized LCAC utilizing experienced gained from Type 716. Just as in the case of Type 716, Tye 722 LCAC suffered delay in construction after design was approved due to the same political turmoil in China, and it was not in 1979 when the first unit entered the service. The prototype was built with aluminum alloy with both the bow and stern door/ramp, and was able to carry up to 15 tons of cargo or a company of soldiers. With displacement of 65 tons, the craft can reach speed of 90 km / hour with the help of four 1100 kW aero-engines. Type 722 received NATO reporting name Jingsha I class LCAC. The sole prototype (452) lacked a bow door for disembarkation, and this feature may have been added to an improved version before entering production. The prototype is believed have been scrapped. Ten are believed to be in service.

However, deployment experienced revealed that the performance of Type 722 was not satisfactory.  The primary design flaw was the same one shared by its direct predecessor, Type 716 LCAC, in that the four engines are gasoline drive, prone to fire.  In addition, the engine was very noise and had a high MTBF rate, and the aluminum alloy was not resistant to salt corrosion.  This shortcoming lead to a massive improvement program that lasted a decade, resulting in Type 722 II LCAC.

Type 722 II LCAC
To solve the problems of the Type 722 LCAC exposed during deployment, designers looked back to its predecessor Type 716 I/II class LCAC for answers, but due to the difference between the two classes, new technologies were needed, including new type of magnesium - aluminum alloy used to replace the original aluminum alloy.  The improvement effort required more resources, and 702nd Research Institute and Chinese navy joined the team to assist 708th Research Institute.

The most significant improvement of Type 722 II LCAC over the original Type 722 is in its propulsion system.  In 1983, an indigenous Type 409 gas-turbine engine based on the WJ-6 (WJ = Wo-Jiang 涡浆) turboprop aero-engine was successfully developed, and it was decided to adopt it for the Type 722 II LCAC. Because this was the very first time a gas-turbine engine was adopted for LCAC, many tests were needed, which protracted the time. It was not until three years later in 1986 when all land-based tests for the Type 409 gas-turbine engine were completed, and then installed on the boat in the following year. Finally, in 1989, the first Type 722 II LCAC was completed and entered the service in the same year. The Type 722 II LCAC received NATO reporting name Jinsha II class LCAC.

The displacement of the Type 722 II LCAC is slightly increased to 70 tons in comparison to the 65 tons of the original Type 722 LCAC, but the cargo capacity is also increased by the same amount to 20 tons total, as opposed to the 15 tons of the original Type 722 LCAC.  It is claimed that the Jinsha II LCAC is roughly the same size the U.S. Navy LCAC, and is designed for similar duties, but in reality, the Chinese equivalent of USN LCAC is actually slightly larger Type 726 LCAC with NATO reporting name Yuyi class. Type 722 II LCAC entered production in limited numbers.

Type 726 LCAC

Type 726 LCAC with NATO reporting name Yuyi class is a natural development of Type 722 series LCAC.  Type 726 LCAC is usually carried by Type 071 amphibious transport dock, and up to four can be housed in the Well deck of Type 071.  Designed by Aviation Industry Corporation of China and constructed by Jiangnan Shipyard, the first unit was launched in December, 2009 and entered Chinese service soon after.  Type 726 LCAC is frequently viewed as the Chinese equivalent of USN LCAC due to their similar size and missions, but Type 726 LCAC carries less cargo because domestic Chinese engine for its LCAC is bulkier and heavier than that of the USN LCAC, but nonetheless, up to 60 tons of cargo can be carried, enough for a Type 99 tank.  In contrast, USN LCAC can carry more around 70 tons of cargo.  Most Chinese internet websites have claimed that the tank Type 726 LCAC will carry would most likely be the lighter Type 96, which will probably be adopted by People's Liberation Army Marine Corps than the heavier and costlier Type 99, but such claims have yet to be verified by official / governmental / western sources. 

Specification:
Length: 30 meter
Beam: 16 meter
Displacement: 150 - 160 tons
Speed: > 60 kts, depending on cargo loads (80 kts reached in trials when unloaded)
Cargo capacity: 50 ton normal, 60 ton (max overload)
Armament: gun mounts for machine guns & grenade launchers

Operators

 People's Liberation Army Navy

Specifications
Crew 5-7?
Dimensions	
Length 27 metres
Width	14 metres
Height: 9.6 metres
full load displacement 70 tons
Propulsion	
Motors turbine engines
Power: 2 propulsion engines, 2 lift engines
Propellers: 2 four-bladed variable-pitch propellers
Performance	
Speed	55 knots
Range 165 nautical mile
Military Lift: 20 tons
Weapons
4 X 14.5 mm machine guns (2 twin)

See also
 Landing Craft Air Cushion

References

Saunders, Stephen (RN) Jane's Fighting Ships 2003-2004 

Amphibious warfare vessels of the People's Liberation Army Navy
Military hovercraft
Landing craft